Spontaneous realism is a form of art, a sub-genre of realism, involving the combination of abstract art, bold color schemes, and apparent brush strokes. The original photo is referenced and then recreated with an unrealistic color palette. Spontaneous realism portraits often use acrylic paint, but other art mediums may be present.

The spontaneous realism art movement began around early 2012. Jos Coufreur, VOKA, and Françoise Nielly were among those involved in its popularization.

Spontaneous realism requires high energy, dynamic strokes, and bright colors. Art is made in an intentionally low-detail way, with seemingly random palettes. Picking palettes is an important part of spontaneous realism, as the colors must be very high contrast. While painting, acrylic paint is recommended, to cover the canvas quickly, making broad brush strokes.

References

Realism (art movement)